The Sumatra worm snake (Argyrophis hypsobothrius) is a species of snake in the Typhlopidae family.

References

Reptiles described in 1917
Argyrophis